Gary McSpadden (January 26, 1943 – April 15, 2020) was an American pastor, singer, songwriter, record producer, television host and motivational speaker. He had musical roots in quartet music and Southern gospel with The Statesmen, The Oak Ridge Boys, The Imperials, The Bill Gaither Trio, and The Gaither Vocal Band. McSpadden's songs include "Jesus Lord To Me", "Hallelujah Praise The Lamb", and  "No Other Name But Jesus". He has produced albums for numerous groups. In 1987, he co-hosted PTL Today after Jim Bakker resigned. McSpadden went on to produce television programs, including the "Jubilee" concert series filmed at Silver Dollar City in Branson, Missouri. He also produced and starred in several live music shows in the Branson area during the 1990s and 2000s.

Early life
Gary McSpadden was born to Boyd and Helen McSpadden. The family later moved to Lubbock, Texas where Gary's father was pastor of Faith Temple. McSpadden grew up in a musical family. His mother and father were songwriters, and at least one of their songs, "Heaven", became popular after it was recorded by George Beverly Shea and others. As a young boy, McSpadden sang in the church and was singing solos by the age of ten.

Career

Singer
In 1962, at the age of 18, McSpadden caught the attention of Hovie Lister, manager of The Statesmen, and sang with the group while lead singer Jake Hess was on medical leave. After five months, he was hired on with The Oak Ridge Quartet. During his time there, the group changed their name to The Oak Ridge Boys, and recorded three albums together.

From 1964 to 1967, McSpadden sang with Jake Hess and the Imperials. It was during his time with them that The Imperials first started singing backup to Elvis Presley.

In 1977, Mcspadden joined Bill And Gloria Gaither in The Bill Gaither Trio, replacing Danny Gaither. During this time, he was a co-pastor for three years, but stepped down by 1980 to focus whole-heartedly on music. In 1981, the Gaithers added a second group called The Gaither Vocal Band. McSpadden, Bill Gaither, Steve Green and Lee Young were the first members in the group.

McSpadden began his solo career in 1979 with his album Higher Purpose. He sang with the Gaither Vocal Band until 1988 when he left to devote more time towards his solo career.

McSpadden has recorded more than 30 albums, 16 of them solo.

Pastor
In 1967, McSpadden left the music ministry to pastor a large non-denominational church with his father in Fort Worth, Texas. The father/son team worked together for 13 years. He pastored Faith and Wisdom Church in Branson, Missouri, teaching faith, wisdom and obedience to the Bible.

Television and live music shows
Gary McSpadden had been broadcasting on television for years. In 1976, he and his father Boyd McSpadden aired a series of programs in Fort Worth, Texas from the church they pastored. Years later, Gary was an occasional guest on The PTL Club with Jim Bakker. After Bakker resigned from the show, McSpadden accepted an invitation to host the program and stayed on for six months.

In January 1999, McSpadden began to host a new live music show at Silver Dollar City called Gospel Jubilee. The show was recorded and broadcast on television every Sunday from January 2000 through January 2003. During the show, he featured an assortment of current popular Christian artists singing gospel favorites.

In 2003, McSpadden also starred in a live show with his brother-in-law Dino Kartsonakis titled the "Easter Spring Spectacular". This show was hosted every spring for four years at various theaters in Branson Missouri.

In 2004, McSpadden moved his live music show to the Americana Theater in Branson and changed the name to Southern Gospel Sundays. He continued to host a variety of current Christian artists at the new theater.

In the years to follow, McSpadden focused more on preaching and teaching the Gospel. The Gary McSpadden Show was broadcast on TCT (Total Christian Television). It still included various Christian artists along with segments by Gary teaching on subjects from the Bible. Today The Gary McSpadden Show focuses totally on the gospel with teachings from various messages. The show still includes a song from a visitor at Faith & Wisdom Church in Branson. It is broadcast on two satellite networks: TCT and GEB.

Producer
Gary McSpadden produced many Dove Award-winning recordings for the Bill Gaither Trio, The Cathedrals, The Gaither Vocal Band, Terri Gibbs, and The Talleys, Lulu Roman, and others.

Death
McSpadden died on April 15, 2020, at the Cancer Center in Tulsa, Oklahoma, where he had been hospitalized for some weeks, having been diagnosed with pancreatic cancer earlier in 2020. He was transferred there from Cox Hospital in Springfield, Missouri, and before his death he suffered some severe complications including a stroke.  He was buried in Woodlawn Cemetery in Nashville, TN, on April 21, 2020, near his parents, with a large memorial service at his Faith and Wisdom Church in Branson, MO.

Awards and honors
McSpadden was inducted into the Gospel Music Association Hall of Fame in 1998, 1999 and 2000. He was also inducted into the Texas Gospel Music Hall Of Fame in 1989.

Discography

Solo albums

Devotional albums

References

External links
Books.google.com
Sghistory.com
News.google.com
Faithworksnow.com
Sghistroy.com

1943 births
American gospel singers
American male singers
Grammy Award winners
2020 deaths
People from Branson, Missouri
People from Mangum, Oklahoma
People from Taney County, Missouri
Singers from Texas
Songwriters from Texas
Southern gospel performers
Record producers from Missouri
Record producers from Oklahoma
Songwriters from Missouri
Songwriters from Oklahoma
Deaths from cancer in Oklahoma
Deaths from pancreatic cancer
American male songwriters